Threskiornis is a genus of ibises,  wading birds of the family Threskiornithidae. They occur in the warmer parts of the Old World in southern Asia, Australasia and Sub-Saharan Africa.  They are colonial breeders, which build a stick nest in a tree or bush and lay two to four eggs. They occur in marshy wetlands and feed on various fish, frogs, crustaceans and insects, in English, they are called sacred ibises.

Description
Adult Threskiornis ibises are typically 75 cm long and have white body plumage. The bald head, neck and legs are black. The bill is thick and curved. Sexes are similar, but juveniles have whiter necks duller plumage. The straw-necked ibis differs from the other species in having dark upperparts, and is some times placed in the separate genus Carphibis (Jameson, 1835) as Carphibis spinicollis. A flightless species, the Reunion ibis, became extinct in the 18th century.

Species

References

 

 
Bird genera
Ibises
Taxa named by George Robert Gray